The men's vault competition at the 2006 Asian Games in Doha, Qatar was held on 2 and 6 December 2006 at the Aspire Hall 2.

Schedule
All times are Arabia Standard Time (UTC+03:00)

Results

Qualification

Final

References

Results
Results

External links
Official website

Artistic Men Vault